HMS Bruiser was built as a Landing Ship, Tank (LST(1)) at Harland and Wolff. Launched in October 1942 and commissioned the following March, she saw service as part of the Allied invasion of Italy.

Design and development
Bruiser was the second of the LST Mk.1 class ships which could carry 13 Churchill tanks, 27 other vehicles and 193 men.

Bruiser had only two sister ships, as plans to build more in the United States led instead to a simpler though slower design capable of similar capacity but with a much shallower draught.

Service
Bruiser took part in the Salerno landing in 1943. In 1944, she was refitted as a  fighter direction ship, for use during the Normandy landings in controlling fighter aircraft by ground-controlled interception. Later in 1944 she took British troops back into Athens in Greece. Bruiser was sold into merchant service in 1946.

Merchant service
Bruiser was sold in 1946 for merchant service as Nilla. In 1951 she was converted to a cargo liner and renamed Silverstar. In 1957 she became Ciudad de Santa Fe and was broken up in Argentina in 1968.

See also

References

Amphibious warfare vessels of the Royal Navy
World War II naval ships of the United Kingdom
Ships built in Belfast
1942 ships
Ships built by Harland and Wolff